Hollow Run is a tributary of Cooks Creek which is located in Durham Township, Bucks County, Pennsylvania in the United States.

Statistics
Hollow Run was entered into the Geographic Names Information System of the U.S. Geological Survey on 30 August 1990 as identification number 1196191. It is contained wholly within Durham Township.

Course
Hollow Run rises on the eastern slope of Buckwampum Hill oriented north for a short distance. It then turns to the northeast then curves back around to the north. At river mile 1.43 it receives a tributary from the left and abruptly turns again to the northeast.

At river mile 1.25 it passes through a pond or dammed reservoir. Shortly after it leaves the pond, it picks up a tributary from the right at river mile 1.05, then flows generally north to its confluence at Cooks Creek's 2.42 river mile.

Geology
Buckwampum Hill is part of the Quartz Fanglomerate formation, from the Jurassic and Triassic, which is a coarse conglomerate of rounded cobbles and boulders. Mineralogy consists of quartzite, sandstone, quartz, and metarhyolite in red sand.

As Hollow Run flows northward, it then runs into a Hornblende and Gneiss formation, from the Precambrian, which also consists of labradorite.

As it approaches Cooks Creek it flows into the Hardyston Formation, from the Cambrian period, consisting of quartzite and feldpathic sandstone and has some quartz pebble conglomerate and is somewhat porous and limonitic.

Crossings and Bridges
Crossings and bridges for this tributary are:
Gallows Hill Road
Lehnenberg Road
Pennsylvania Route 212 (Durham Road)
Old Philadelphia Road

References

Rivers of Bucks County, Pennsylvania
Rivers of Pennsylvania
Tributaries of the Delaware River